Juan Domingo Suárez (born 1 May 1952) is an Argentine boxer. He competed in the men's light heavyweight event at the 1976 Summer Olympics.

References

External links
 

1952 births
Living people
Light-heavyweight boxers
Argentine male boxers
Olympic boxers of Argentina
Boxers at the 1976 Summer Olympics
Boxers at the 1975 Pan American Games
Pan American Games bronze medalists for Argentina
Pan American Games medalists in boxing
Place of birth missing (living people)
Medalists at the 1975 Pan American Games
20th-century Argentine people